Daphnella cancellata is a species of sea snail, a marine gastropod mollusk in the family Raphitomidae.

Description
The length of the shell attains 22 mm, its diameter 8 mm.

(Original description) The thin, finely cancellated shell has a fusiform shape. The spire is acute. The aperture is oblong, slightly channelled in front. It shows a slight posterior sinus. Its colour is yellowish-white, slightly blotched with brown.

Distribution
This marine species is endemic to New Zealand and occurs off Northland to Bay of Plenty and East Cape

References

 Hutton ; Jour. de Conch., 1878 p. 18.
 Powell, A.W.B. 1979: New Zealand Mollusca: Marine, Land and Freshwater Shells, Collins, Auckland 
 Spencer, H.G., Marshall, B.A. & Willan, R.C. (2009). Checklist of New Zealand living Mollusca. Pp 196-219. in: Gordon, D.P. (ed.) New Zealand inventory of biodiversity. Volume one. Kingdom Animalia: Radiata, Lophotrochozoa, Deuterostomia. Canterbury University Press, Christchurch.

External links
 
 Spencer H.G., Willan R.C., Marshall B.A. & Murray T.J. (2011). Checklist of the Recent Mollusca Recorded from the New Zealand Exclusive Economic Zone

cancellata
Gastropods described in 1878
Gastropods of New Zealand